The Alligator (Grand Canyon), is a -elevation summit, a large ridgeline butte, connected to, and below Mohave Point (South Rim), approximately  northwest of Grand Canyon Village, Grand Canyon. The ridgeline trends north, and the lower elevation cliff, the tail of the alligator, turns northwest. The Alligator lies between the Monument Creek (Grand Canyon) drainage, west, and the Salt Creek (Grand Canyon) drainage, east, both short, south tributaries to the Colorado.

The Alligator is composed of bright red-orange Supai Group ( four members), (cliffs, and slopes), upon a red, Redwall Limestone, large cliff. Also being a cliff-former, the curving "tail-of-the-alligator" is a flat-topped platform of the Redwall Limestone.

Geology

Because both are cliff-formers (and therefor shelf-formers), the high-point of The Alligator is on the upper platform (shelf) of the Supai Group, the highly resistant Esplanade Sandstone. The curved tail of The Alligator is the bottom platform, sitting on top of the highly resistant Redwall Limestone. As the tail curves, a smaller, secondary cliff-platform (above the Redwall), is composed of Supai unit 2, the also resistant Manakacha Formation. (The Redwall base, also sits on a shorter cliff (and platform), of Tonto Group, no. 3, the Muav Limestone). The rest of the Tonto Group sits on the Granite Gorge at the Colorado River with the walls of Vishnu Basement Rocks.

References

External links

 Aerial view, The Alligator (Grand Canyon) Mountainzone

Grand Canyon
Landforms of Coconino County, Arizona